Stelarc (born Στέλιος Αρκαδίου Stelios Arcadiou in Limassol in 1946; legally changed his name in 1972) is a Cyprus-born Australian performance artist raised in the Melbourne suburb of Sunshine, whose works focus heavily on extending the capabilities of the human body. As such, most of his pieces are centered on his concept that "the human body is obsolete". Until 2007 he held the position of principal research fellow in the Performance Arts Digital Research Unit at Nottingham Trent University in Nottingham, England. He is currently furthering his research at Curtin University in Western Australia.

Performances

Stelarc's idiosyncratic performances often involve robotics or other relatively modern technology integrated with his body. In 26 different performances he has suspended himself in flesh hook suspension, often with one of his robotic inventions integrated. His last suspension performance was held in Melbourne in March 2012.

In another performance he allowed his body to be controlled remotely by electronic muscle stimulators connected to the internet. He has also performed with a robotic third arm, and a pneumatic spider-like six-legged walking machine which sits the user in the center of the legs and allows them to control the machine through arm gestures.

In 2020, a work by Stelarc entitled Reclining Stickman, a robot sculpture operated by the artist, featured in the Adelaide Biennial of Australian Art at the Art Gallery of South Australia (AGSA). However, AGSA had to temporarily close from 25 March 2020 owing to the COVID-19 pandemic in Australia, so some of the exhibits are being shown online, along with virtual tours of the exhibition. Stelarc performed with his sculpture in real time, as well as making the videorecording available.

Third ear
In 2007, Stelarc had a cell-cultivated ear surgically attached to his left arm. His longtime collaborator, fellow Australian artist Nina Sellars, photographed this body modification for her piece Oblique: Images from Stelarc's Extra Ear Surgery. Pieces by both artists were included in a group exhibition that received an exhibition review in scientific journal BMJ.

Works
In 2005, MIT Press published Stelarc: The Monograph which is the first extensive study of Stelarc's prolific work. It includes images of performances and interviews with several writers including William Gibson, who recount their meetings with Stelarc. In 2016 book on Robots and Art 
 Stelarc reflected on his own work in a chapter titled "Encounters, Anecdotes and Insights—Prosthetics, Robotics and Art".

Awards and honors
 In 1995 Stelarc was awarded a three-year fellowship from the Australia Council for the Arts.
 In 1997 Carnegie Mellon University appointed him Honorary Professor of Art and Robotics.
 In 1998 he was artist-in-residence for the city of Hamburg, Germany.
 In 2000 Monash University awarded him an Honorary Degree of Laws.
 In March 2003, at The Ohio State University, he completed an artist-in-residence program.
 In 2008 he was appointed as senior research fellow and artist-in-residence, MARCS Auditory Laboratories, University of Western Sydney, Australia.
 In 2010 Stelarc received the prestigious Ars Electronica Golden Nica in the category "Hybrid Art", Linz, Austria.

See also
 Marcel·lí Antúnez Roca
 Shu Lea Cheang
 Marco Donnarumma
 Neil Harbisson
 God helmet
 Kevin Warwick

References

Further reading
Donnarumma, Marco. “Fractal Flesh — Alternate Anatomical Architectures: Interview with Stelarc.” eContact! 14.2 — Biotechnological Performance Practice / Pratiques de performance biotechnologique (July 2012). Montréal: CEC.
Stelarc. “[Gallery] Stelarc.” eContact! 14.2 — Biotechnological Performance Practice / Pratiques de performance biotechnologique (July 2012). Montréal: CEC.

External links

 Stelarc's - homepage
 - Stelarc's old homepage at Virtual Artists
 

1946 births
Australian conceptual artists
Australian contemporary artists
Australian people of Greek Cypriot descent
Australian performance artists
Australian roboticists
Australian transhumanists
BioArtists
Body art
Cypriot emigrants to Australia
Living people
People known for their body modification
Philosophers of art
Philosophers of science
Philosophers of technology
Postmodern artists
Robotic art
People from Sunshine, Victoria